Carrie Black may refer to:

Carrie Nelson Black in Ohio Women's Hall of Fame
Carrie Black (OITNB)